CLAMP no Kiseki (CLAMP's track or CLAMP's miracle) is a twelve volume series of anime books celebrating the 15th anniversary of Clamp in 2004. It is published in America by Tokyopop and in Spain by Norma Editorial.  Each volume is a full-color, 32-page book that contains summaries of featured series, interviews with Clamp and friends of Clamp, artwork, and exclusive new short comics. In addition, each issue comes with three special chess pieces featuring characters from Clamp's various series.

All twelve volumes have been released in Japan, Spain, Germany, Hong Kong, Taiwan, and the United States.

Volumes

After collecting them all there was also a possibility to send in coupons within a limited time to receive a White King Kero-chan (Cardcaptor Sakura), a Black King Spinel Sun (Cardcaptor Sakura), a chess board and a magazine holder for the twelve magazines. This offer was not available outside Japan.

Spanish publisher Norma Editorial sold the magazine holder, chess board, and poster as a separate special edition volume. After all volumes were released, a bundle deal was sold to the public for 49,00 Euros. It included all volumes with their respective chess pieces as well as the special edition items. Like in Japan, the Spinel Sun and Kero-chan chess pieces were available to anyone who sent in 12 coupons (1 for each volume) to the publisher. Quantities were limited.

In 2006, French publisher Pika Edition had a preview sale of 50 Kero-chan and Spinel Sun Storage Boxes that only newsletter subscribers could purchase for 40 Euros. It was then announced that a limited quantity of 100 Storage Boxes would be made available to the rest of the public via Pika's website.

Reception
Lesley Smith from Animefringe praised the work as being every fan's dream.

References

External links
Official website (Japanese)
Tokyopop's Official Website
 

Works by Clamp (manga artists)
Tokyopop titles
Chess sets
Chess in art